Ray O'Jean Pleasant (April 22, 1928 – May 27, 2022) was an American politician in the state of Minnesota.

Pleasant was born in Jetmore, Kansas. He served in the United States Army during the Korean War as an army engineer and received his bachelor's degree in electric engineering from University of Kansas in 1951. Pleasant worked for Remington Rand and was sent to Minneapolis, Minnesota. He then lived in Bloomington, Minnesota with his wife and family and served on the Bloomington City Council from 1970 to 1973. Pleasant then served in the Minnesota House of Representatives from 1973 to 1980 as an Independent Republican member, representing district 39B. He was the second African-American to be elected to the Minnesota House of Representatives, and the first since the election of John Francis Wheaton in 1899.

Pleasant's wife A. Gene Crenshaw served for a time on the judicial selection board of the governor of Minnesota.

References

1928 births
2022 deaths
People from Bloomington, Minnesota
People from Hodgeman County, Kansas
Military personnel from Kansas
Minnesota city council members
Republican Party members of the Minnesota House of Representatives
African-American state legislators in Minnesota
University of Kansas alumni
21st-century African-American people
20th-century African-American people